Franz-Josef Holzenkamp (born 8 January 1960) is a German politician of the Christian Democratic Union (CDU) who served in the Bundestag between 2005 and 2017.

Political career
From 2005 until 2017, Holzenkamp was a Member of the German Parliament, representing the Cloppenburg – Vechta constituency. Throughout his tenure, he served on the Committee on Food and Agriculture. He did not run in the 2017 elections; his successor is Silvia Breher.

Since 2017, Holzenkamp has been the President of the Deutscher Raiffeisenverband (DRV).

Other activities
 Landwirtschaftliche Rentenbank, Deputy Chair of the Supervisory Board
 AGRAVIS Raiffeisen AG, Chairman of the Supervisory Board (since 2012)
 LVM-Krankenversicherungs AG, Member of the Supervisory Board (since 1999)
 LVM-Lebensversicherungs AG, Member of the Supervisory Board (since 1999)

Personal life 
Holzenkamp is married and has four children.

References

External links 
 Bundestag.de: Franz-Josef Holzenkamp (German)
 NordWestZeitung: Desaströses Ergebnis (German)

Members of the Bundestag for Lower Saxony
20th-century German politicians
1960 births
Living people
Members of the Bundestag 2013–2017
Members of the Bundestag 2009–2013
Members of the Bundestag 2005–2009
Members of the Bundestag for the Christian Democratic Union of Germany